Erin Enderlin is an American Country Music artist and songwriter. Her songs have been recorded by Alan Jackson, Lee Ann Womack, Randy Travis, Reba McEntire and Terri Clark.  She has also twice appeared on the Country Throwdown Tour as a member of their Bluebird Cafe songwriter stage.

Early life 
Erin Enderlin was born and raised in Conway, Arkansas.  She moved to Nashville to attend MTSU and pursue a career as an artist and songwriter.

Songwriter 
Enderlin penned Alan Jackson's "Monday Morning Church" which went to number 5 on the Billboard Country Chart in 2004.  "Last Call" was recorded by Lee Ann Womack and went to number 14 on the same chart in 2008.

Artist 
As an artist, Erin Enderlin has had two albums released, one recorded and produced by Jamey Johnson and Jim "Moose" Brown.

References 

American women country singers
American country singer-songwriters
Living people
Year of birth missing (living people)
21st-century American women